Trevor Clay, CBE, FRCN (10 May 1936 in Nuneaton, Warwickshire, England – 23 April 1994 in Harefield, Middlesex, England) was a British nurse and former General Secretary of the Royal College of Nursing.

Clay began his nursing career in 1957, but it was as General Secretary of the RCN, beginning in 1982, that he became a public trade union official and negotiator. He had been Deputy Secretary since 1979 but was not a public figure.

In 1982, almost at the outset of his tenure he began negotiations with the UK government over a labour disagreement concerning nurses' salaries, then at yearly levels of no more than £5,833. As a result, a "Pay Review Body" characterized by autonomous operation was created; the compensation of the nurses he represented was also increased.

Clay was diagnosed with severe emphysema at the age of 37. With a membership in excess of 285,000 at the time of Clay's pensioning off due to illness in September 1989, no labor organization unaffiliated with the Trades Union Congress surpassed the RCN in size, and none had a greater rate of expansion. He was made a Fellow of the Royal College of Nursing in 1985.  Clay's respiratory disease claimed his life, aged 57, in 1994.

Writing
He authored the following books:
The Workings of the Nursing and Midwifery Advisory Committee in the National Health Service, 1974
Nurses: power and politics, 1987

References

1936 births
1994 deaths
British activists
British non-fiction writers
British nursing administrators
British trade unionists
Commanders of the Order of the British Empire
Deaths from emphysema
People from Nuneaton
Fellows of the Royal College of Nursing
British male writers
Male non-fiction writers
British nurses